The Galician People's Front is a Galician political organization with a socialist and independentist ideology.

History
After the Galician People's Union (UPG) accepted the participation of the Bloque Nacionalista Galego (BNG) in the Galician Parliament in 1986, 13 members of its Central Committee led by Mariano Abalo and Xan Carballo left the party and created the Communist Collective. On 25 July 1986, the group was transformed into the Communist Party of National Liberation (PCLN). Later, the 3rd National Assembly of the BNG expelled the group because they gave support to Herri Batasuna.

In 1987, PCLN and Galiza Ceibe-OLN, along with other small organizations, created the FPG. In June 1989, they suffered a split as the sectors that supported the armed struggle of the EGPGC broke away and formed Assembleia do Povo Unido. In the Elections for the Galician Parliament 2001, the group obtained 3,176 votes (0.3%), in the Elections for the Spanish Parliament 2004, it obtained 2,257 votes (0.12%), and in the Elections for the Galician Parliament 2005, it obtained 2,982 votes (0.2%).

Since 2012, the FPG is part of Anova-Nationalist Brotherhood.

Elections

Gallery

References

Notes

External links
Official Web of the FPG (in Galician)
Official Web of Xeira!, the FPG youth organization  (in Galician)

1986 establishments in Spain
Communist parties in Spain
Far-left politics in Spain
Galician nationalist parties
Left-wing nationalist parties
Political parties established in 1986
Political parties in Galicia (Spain)
Secessionist organizations in Europe
Socialist parties in Galicia (Spain)